José Jiménez may refer to:

Entertainment
 José Jiménez (character), fictional character created by U.S. comedian Bill Dana
 José Ximénez (1601–1672), Spanish organist
 José Julián Jiménez (1823–1880), Cuban violinist and composer
 José Alfredo Jiménez (1926–1973), Mexican singer-songwriter in the ranchera style
 José Jiménez Fernández (born 1943, known as Joselito), Spanish child actor and singer
 El Viejín (José Jiménez, born 1963), Spanish flamenco guitarist
 José Jiménez Lozano (born 1930), Spanish writer

Politics
 Jose Cha Cha Jimenez (born 1948), Puerto Rican nationalist, founder of the Young Lords Movement
 José Jiménez Negrón (born 1954), PNP member of the 15th Legislative Assembly of Puerto Rico

Sports
 José Jiménez (baseball) (born 1973), Dominican Major League Baseball pitcher
 José Isabel Jiménez (1915–2014), Mexican baseball journalist, author and broadcaster
 José Patrocinio Jiménez (born 1953), Colombian cyclist
 José María Jiménez (1971–2003), professional road bicycle racer
 José Luis Jiménez (born 1983), Chilean footballer
 José Romero Jiménez (born 1985), Spanish footballer who plays for CD Guijuelo
 José Jiménez (athlete) (José R. Jiménez Pérez), Mexican sprinter

Other
 José F. Jiménez (1946–1969), U.S. Marine Corps Medal of Honor recipient, killed in action in Vietnam
 José Mariano Jiménez (1781–1811), Mexican engineer and rebel officer in the War of Independence
 José Jiménez (1742–1820), bishop of the Roman Catholic Diocese of Cartagena

See also
 José Manuel Jiménez (disambiguation)